Saint-Émilion (Gascon: Sent Milion) is a commune in the Gironde department in Nouvelle-Aquitaine in southwestern France. In 2016, it had a population of 1,938.

In the heart of the country of Libournais (the area around Libourne), in a region of wine hills, Saint-Emilion is a medieval city located at the crossroads of Bordeaux, Saintonge and Périgord. The town and surrounding vineyards was made a UNESCO World Heritage Site in 1999, owing to its long, living history of wine-making, Romanesque churches and ruins stretching all along steep and narrow streets.

History
Saint-Émilion's history goes back at least 35,000 years ago, to the Upper Paleolithic. An oppidum was built on the hill overlooking the present-day city in Gaulish times, before the regions was annexed by Augustus in 27 BC. The Romans planted vineyards in what was to become Saint-Émilion as early as the 2nd century. In the 4th century, the Latin poet Ausonius lauded the fruit of the bountiful vine.

Saint-Émilion, previously called Ascumbas, was renamed after the Breton monk Émilion (d.767), a travelling confessor, who settled in a hermitage carved into the rock there in the 8th century. The monks who followed him started up the commercial wine production in the area.

Because the region was located on the route of the Camino de Santiago, many monasteries and churches were built during the Middle Ages, and in 1199, while under Plantagenet rule, the town was granted full rights. During the 12th and 13th centuries, the wines produced in the area were well-renowned for their quality, although political instability during the European wars of religion negatively affected the vineyards. The region only began to recover in the late 19th century.

Geography and Description
Saint-Émilion station has rail connections to Bordeaux, Bergerac and Sarlat-la-Canéda. Vineyards make up more than 67% of the land area of the commune. Within the region there is a mix of medieval Romanesque religious architecture and vineyard "chateaux", built in 18th and 19th centuries. In the villages, however, most of the buildings are modest, one-story stone houses dating from the 19th century.

Population

Sights
 Romanesque church
 Monolithic church, carved from a limestone cliff

Wine

Saint-Émilion is one of the principal red wine areas of Bordeaux along with the Médoc, Graves and Pomerol. The region is much smaller than the Médoc and adjoins Pomerol.  As in Pomerol and the other appellations on the right bank of the Gironde, the primary grape varieties used are the Merlot and Cabernet Franc, with relatively small amounts of Cabernet Sauvignon also being used by some châteaux.

Saint Émilion wines were not included in the 1855 Bordeaux classification. The first formal classification in Saint-Émilion was made in 1955.  Unlike the 1855 classification, it is regularly revised.

Saint-Émilion Jazz Festival 
Since 2012, Saint-Émilion hosts a jazz festival at the end of July.

Personalities
 Marguerite-Élie Guadet
 Clément Fayat

See also
 Cordeliers Cloister
 Bordeaux wine
 French wine
 Plan Bordeaux
 Bordeaux wine regions
 Classification of Saint-Émilion wine
 Communes of the Gironde department
 Cour Saint-Émilion (Paris Métro)

References

External links

 
 Saint-Émilion tourist office website
 aerial photography of the Saint-Émilion and Aquitaine area
 Cash-strapped French wine town Saint Emilion sells off historical monument RFI English

World Heritage Sites in France
Communes of Gironde